Dennis Powers (born 1953) is an American politician. He serves as a Republican member of the Tennessee House of Representatives for the 36th District, encompassing Campbell County and parts of Union and Anderson Counties.

Biography

Early life
He was born on September 14, 1953 in LaFollette, Tennessee. He graduated from LaFollette High School and received a Bachelor of Business Administration from the University of Tennessee in Knoxville, Tennessee.

Career
He started his career at the Baird Supply Company as a salesman, followed by the Furtex Corporation as a machinist, and later at the LaFollette Hardware and Lumber Co., a construction company. He then worked as an Electronic Data Processing Technician for Union Carbide (a subsidiary of Dow Chemical) in Oak Ridge, Tennessee with a Security Q clearance. He also worked in the Energy Department Manager of the East Tennessee Human Resource Agency (ETHRA) for Campbell, Union and surrounding counties. He now works as an insurance agent.

He is former President of the Campbell County Young Republicans. From 1992 to 1996, he was a Republican nominee for the 36th district of Tennessee. Since 2010, he has served two terms for this district as a state congressman.

He is a member of the Tennessee Tea Party, the Heritage Foundation, the American Legislative Exchange Council (ALEC), the National Right to Life, the National Rifle Association, the National Federation of Independent Business, the Tennessee Farm Bureau Federation, and the National Conference of State Legislators.

He is a member of Friends of Cove Lake State Park, committee chair of the Boy Scouts of America, and serves on the Campbell County Board of Habitat for Humanity. He volunteers at LaFollette Medical Center. Other philanthropic endeavors include the Wounded Warrior Project, the American Cancer Society and Relay for Life.

Personal life
He is married to Tracy (Adkins) Powers, and they attend the First Baptist Church of Jacksboro, Tennessee.

Political stances
Stated on February 21, 2023 in a debate regarding HB 327 which would make the Tennessee Office of Faith-Based Initiatives funded by the state, that he believes the decisions made by the Supreme Court including Brown vs. Board of Education, Dred Scott, and Plessy vs Ferguson, were wrong decisions.

In March 2023, Powers introduced a bill to expand the methods of execution in Tennessee to include electrocution and later added an amendment to also include firing squads, claiming that it would be beneficial for the families of victims and that firing squad was the preferred method by death row inmates. Democrats criticized the bill as supporting "cruel and unusual punishment" that increased  the pain of execution and a "step backward".

References

Living people
1953 births
People from LaFollette, Tennessee
People from Jacksboro, Tennessee
Republican Party members of the Tennessee House of Representatives
21st-century American politicians